
Gmina Gietrzwałd is a rural gmina (administrative district) in Olsztyn County, Warmian-Masurian Voivodeship, in northern Poland.

Villages
Gmina Gietrzwałd contains the villages and settlements of Barduń, Barwiny, Biesal, Cegłowo, Dłużki, Gietrzwałd, Grazymy, Gronity, Guzowy Młyn, Guzowy Piec, Jadaminy, Kudypy, Łajsy, Łęgucki Młyn, Łęguty, Łopkajny, Łupstych, Naglady, Naterki, Nowy Młyn, Parwółki, Pęglity, Podlejki, Rapaty, Rentyny, Salminek (German: Sallmeien), Siła, Smoleń, Śródka, Sząbruk, Tomarynki, Tomaryny, Unieszewo, Woryty, Zaskwierki and Zdrojek.

Neighbouring gminas
Gmina Gietrzwałd is bordered by the city of Olsztyn and by the gminas of Jonkowo, Łukta, Olsztynek, Ostróda and Stawiguda.

References
Polish official population figures 2006

Gietrzwald
Olsztyn County